Klosterwasser is a river of Saxony, Germany. It is a right tributary of the Black Elster, which it joins near Wittichenau. The source of the Klosterwasser/Klóšterska woda is located in Burkau/Porchow, Germany, in the Lusatian Highlands (Lausitzer Bergland) near the Czech border.

See also
List of rivers of Saxony

Rivers of Saxony
Rivers of Germany